The Marsha Warfield Show is an American daytime talk show that aired for ten months on NBC from 1990 to 1991. Comedian and actress Marsha Warfield served as host.

Overview
Each show featured several guests who, on the surface, did not seem to have anything in common. Warfield then got her guests to talk about hot-topic issues. The show was light-hearted and Warfield's set included a basketball hoop.

References

External links
 
 The Marsha Warfield Show New York Times profile

1990 American television series debuts
1991 American television series endings
1990s American television talk shows
English-language television shows
NBC original programming
Television series by Kline and Friends